Khorof Harar is a settlement in Kenya's Wajir County.

References 

Khorof Harar people are mostly nomads and pastoralist people whose source of livelihood is from keeping of livestock. In northern Khorof Harar, 6 km away from the town, is a large dam owned by a resident, Ahmed Abdkirahmam Muhumed. The dam serves many nomads during and after the rainy seasons. The location of the dam is called LAGTA, Marehan Community is mostly populated there.

Populated places in North Eastern Province (Kenya)
Wajir County